The  Charlotte Rage season was the first for the franchise. The Rage finished 6-6 and qualified for the playoffs, where they were defeated by the Arizona Rattlers 56-49.

Regular season

Schedule

Standings

z – clinched homefield advantage

y – clinched division title

x – clinched playoff spot

Playoffs

Roster

References

External links
1993 Charlotte Rage on ArenaFan.com

1993 Arena Football League season
Charlotte Rage seasons
Charlotte